The Remote Application Programming Interface (RAPI) is a remote procedure call (RPC) mechanism in which the Pocket PC is the server and the PC application is the client. In other words, RAPI allows PC applications to call functions that are executed on the Pocket PC. With RAPI, the registry, file system, database, and configuration of the Pocket PC device are available to the PC application.

Microsoft application programming interfaces